The 1954 Minnesota Golden Gophers football team represented the University of Minnesota in the 1954 Big Ten Conference football season. In their first year under head coach Murray Warmath, the Golden Gophers compiled a 7–2 record and outscored their opponents by a combined total of 195 to 127. The team finished the season ranked #20 in the final Coaches poll.
 
Halfback Bob McNamara received the team's Most Valuable Player award, and was selected by the Football Writers Association of America (for Look magazine) as a first-team player on the 1954 College Football All-America Team. He was also selected by the Associated Press as a first-team player on its 1954 All-Big Ten Conference football team. Fullback John Baumgartner was named Academic All-Big Ten.

Total attendance for the season was 347,555, which averaged to 57,925. The season high for attendance was against Iowa.

Schedule

Roster
 Gino Cappelletti #15

References

Minnesota
Minnesota Golden Gophers football seasons
Minnesota Golden Gophers football